Lenora Township is a township in Griggs County, North Dakota, United States.

Demographics
Its population during the 2010 census was 60.

Location within Griggs County
Lenora Township is located in Township 148 Range 58 west of the Fifth principal meridian.

References

Townships in Griggs County, North Dakota